Steven Michael Woods Jr. (April 17, 1980 – September 13, 2011) was an American who was executed by lethal injection in the state of Texas. Woods was sentenced to death after a jury convicted him of the capital murders of Ronald Whitehead, 21, and Bethena Brosz, 19, on May 2, 2001 in The Colony, Texas. Woods petitioned to media outlets for prisoner rights in February 2004.

He was incarcerated on the Texas state death row for men, located in the Allan B. Polunsky Unit (formerly the Terrell Unit) in West Livingston, Texas. In late 2006, Woods was part of a hunger strike in Polunsky, to oppose death-row inmates' treatment.

Sentencing
Woods' co-defendant, Marcus Rhodes, pleaded guilty to shooting both victims to death with a firearm in the same criminal transaction and received a life sentence. During the trial, authorities were revealed to have recovered backpacks belonging to the slain pair along with shell casings and a bloodied knife in Rhodes' car. Guns used in the slayings were also recovered from the home of Rhodes' parents.

However, in Texas, the law of parties states that a person can be criminally responsible for the actions of another if he or she aids and abets, conspires with the principal, or anticipates the crime. Although Rhodes pleaded guilty to the murders and Woods did not, and  no physical evidence tied Woods to the scene, Woods was executed for the crime. Witnesses testified at Woods' 2002 trial that  Rhodes and he said that they lured Whitehead to an isolated road on the pretense of a drug deal and that Woods shot and killed him, because Whitehead knew about a killing 2 months earlier in California. Rhodes was later found guilty of the California murder and Woods was not. Prosecutors said Brosz was merely driving her boyfriend Whitehead to the drug deal. Brosz had been killed because she witnessed Whitehead's death, yelled, and then attempted to flee.

Controversy
The fairness of Woods' case and punishment was criticized by Amnesty International. Woods' criminal case was reported locally and internationally. Woods' final motion for a stay was denied on September 2, 2011.

Execution
In his last words, Woods stated:

Woods then took several deep breaths before all body movement stopped. A needle carrying the lethal drugs into his right arm pierced a green tattoo of a rose branch. The same distinctive tattoo had identified him when he was arrested. Woods was pronounced dead on September 13, 2011,  at 6:22 p.m. Woods' was the 10th execution carried out in Texas in 2011 and the 474th since Texas resumed the death penalty in 1982.

See also
 List of people executed in Texas, 2010–2019
 List of people executed in the United States in 2011

References

1980 births
2011 deaths
2001 murders in the United States
American people convicted of murder
21st-century executions by Texas
People from Wayne County, Michigan
People executed by Texas by lethal injection
People convicted of murder by Texas
People executed for murder
21st-century executions of American people
Executed people from Michigan